Johannesburg is the tenth extended play by British folk rock band Mumford & Sons, which was recorded during the band's tour in South Africa in early 2016. It is a collaboration with Senegalese singer Baaba Maal, South African pop group Beatenberg, and Malawian-British singer-producer combo the Very Best.
The EP was released on 17 June 2016 through Island Records.

Track listing

Personnel
Credits adapted from AllMusic

 Mumford & Sons – primary artist, production
 Baaba Maal – featured artist
 The Very Best – featured artist
 Beatenberg – featured artist
 Johan Hugo – production
 Dan Grech-Marguerat – additional production, programming
 Michael Brauer – mixing
 Bob Ludwig – mastering
 Chris Maas – photography
 David East – photography
 Ross Stirling	– artwork

Charts

Weekly charts

Year-end charts

References

2016 EPs
Mumford & Sons albums
Island Records EPs